Kiriberiyakele Grama Niladhari Division is a  Grama Niladhari Division of the  Homagama Divisional Secretariat  of Colombo District  of Western Province, Sri Lanka .  It has Grama Niladhari Division Code 484F.

Kiriberiyakele is a surrounded by the  Godagama South, Kandanawatta, Pitipana North, Prasannapura, Mawathgama and Pitipana Town  Grama Niladhari Divisions.

Demographics

Ethnicity 

The Kiriberiyakele Grama Niladhari Division has  a Sinhalese majority (98.7%) . In comparison, the Homagama Divisional Secretariat (which contains the Kiriberiyakele Grama Niladhari Division) has  a Sinhalese majority (98.1%)

Religion 

The Kiriberiyakele Grama Niladhari Division has  a Buddhist majority (97.3%) . In comparison, the Homagama Divisional Secretariat (which contains the Kiriberiyakele Grama Niladhari Division) has  a Buddhist majority (96.2%)

References 

Grama Niladhari Divisions of Homagama Divisional Secretariat